Dental surgery is any of a number of medical procedures that involve artificially modifying dentition; in other words, surgery of the teeth, gums and jaw bones.

Types

Some of the more common are:

 Endodontic (surgery involving the pulp or root of the tooth)
 Root canal treatment
 Pulpotomy — the opening of the pulp chamber of the tooth to allow an infection to drain; usually a precursor to a root canal
 Pulpectomy — the removal of the pulp from the pulp chamber to temporarily relieve pain; usually a precursor to a root canal
 Apicoectomy — a root-end resection.  Occasionally a root canal alone is enough to relieve pain and the end of the tooth, called the apex, is removed by entering through the gingiva and surgically extracting the diseased material.
 Prosthodontics (dental prosthetics)
 Crown (caps) — artificial covering of a tooth made from a variety of biocompatible materials, including CMC/PMC (ceramic/porcelain metal composite), gold or a tin/aluminum mixture.  The underlying tooth must be reshaped to accommodate these fixed restorations 
 Veneers — artificial coverings similar to above, except that they only cover the forward (labial or buccal) surface of the tooth. Usually for aesthetic purposes only.
 Bridge — a fixed prothesis in which two or more crowns are connected together, which replace a missing tooth or teeth through a bridge.  Typically used after an extraction.
 Implant — a procedure in which a titanium implant is surgically placed in the bone (mandible or maxilla), allowed to heal, and 4–6 months later an artificial tooth is connected to the implant by cement or retained by a screw.
 Dentures (false teeth) — a partial or complete set of dentition which either attach to neighboring teeth by use of metal or plastic grasps or to the gingival or palatal surface by use of adhesive.
 Implant-supported prosthesis — a combination of dentures and implants; bases are placed into the bone, allowed to heal, and metal appliances are fixed to the gingival surface, following which dentures are placed atop and fixed into place.
 Orthodontic treatment
 Implants and implant-supported prosthesis — also an orthodontic treatment as it involves bones
 Apicoectomy — also an orthodontic treatment as part of the underlying bone structure must be removed
 Extraction — a procedure in which a diseased, redundant, or problematic tooth is removed, either by pulling or cutting out.  This procedure can be done under local or general anesthesia and is very common — many people have their wisdom teeth removed before they become problematic.
Fiberotomy — a procedure to sever the fibers around a tooth, preventing it from relapsing
Periodontics
Oral and maxillofacial surgery (a surgical specialty that usually requires both dental and medical qualification)

Professional dental care

More frequent than usual cleaning and examination may be necessary during the treatment of many different dental/oral disorders or due to recent surgical procedures such as dental implants. The American Dental Association (ADA) stresses that the frequency of dental visits necessary is dependent upon the needs of each individual with some able to go once or twice a year and others needing to go more often. This may include yearly, select dental X-rays. See also dental plaque identification procedure and removal.

Dental instruments and restorative materials

Dental anesthesia

Dentists inject anesthetic to block sensory transmission by the alveolar nerves. The superior alveolar nerves are not usually anesthetized directly because they are difficult to approach with a needle. For this reason, the maxillary teeth are usually anesthetized locally by inserting the needle beneath the oral mucosa surrounding the teeth. The inferior alveolar nerve is probably anesthetized more often than any other nerve in the body. To anesthetize this nerve, the dentist inserts the needle somewhat beyond the patient's last molar.

See also

 Dentistry
 Oral and maxillofacial surgery
 Surgery
 Dental extraction
 Wisdom tooth

References 

Dentistry procedures
Surgical specialties
Dentistry